Aksharapalli is a certain type of alphasyllabic numeration scheme extensively used in the pagination of manuscripts produced  in India in pre-modern times. The name Aksharapalli can be translated as the letter system. In this system the letters or the syllables of the script in which the manuscript is written are used to denote the numbers. In contrast to the Aksharapalli system, the ordinary decimal system is called the Ankapalli system.

Examples of syllables used to represent numerals
The following tables give examples of syllables used to represent numerals. The lists are not exhaustive.

Usage
When the Aksharapalli system is used, the various syllables that constitute a number are placed one below the other as in the Chinese language and they are written in the margins of the various leaves of the manuscript. This arrangement may be the consequence an attempt to save space for the contents of the manuscript. This method can be seen in the earliest available manuscript containing the Aksharapalli system which is a manuscript of sixth century CE.

History
Nothing definitely is known about the origin of the system. It is conjectured that the system might have evolved from the ciphered-additive numeral system of Brahmi. This system has been extensively used in Jain manuscripts up to sixteenth century. The system has also survived for a long time in Nepal. The system was in use as late as the nineteenth century in those regions of India which now constitute the Kerala State.

References

Numeral systems
Indian mathematics